The Palandomus invented in 1919 by architect Mario Palanti, consists of a cement block of 18x18x36cm made with the vibration system, to serve as the cellular element of construction, being designed with a particular shape "hermaphrodite", which allows placement in any sense, without the constraints of location if not horizontal. In fact the thin ledge, ribs protrusion allow to leave the walls without plaster, but at the same time, ensure the maximum bonding of the elements. The Palandomus is sufficient to withstand up to safety limit of 70 meters in elevation, allowing, without special precautions, the installation of jack arch to openings doors and windows and of dry archivolt.

Bibliography
 Mario Palanti, Architettura per tutti, editore E. Bestetti, 1946
 Eleonora Trivellin, Storia della tecnica edilizia in Italia: dall'unità ad oggi, Alinea editore, 2006 
 Ramón Gutiérrez, Architettura e società: l'América Latina nel XX secolo, Jaca Book, 1996 
 Virginia Bonicatto, “Reason, Economy and Technique”. The Palandomus Constructive System and its Ephemeral Application in Housing (December, 2018)

See also

 Mario Palanti

External links
 U. S. Patent for a Palanti block in 1923
 Mario Palanti architectural records, Montevideo, Uruguay, 1919-1946. Archival materials at the Getty Library.
  CA000000237760A	
  CH000000106720A	
  FR000000854704A	
  FR000000833295A	
  FR000000566823A
  GB000000515842A	
  GB000000205031A
  US000002271030A
  US000001552077A

Building materials
1919 introductions
Masonry